William Douglas Figg is an American scientist (pharmacologist). He is a senior investigator (tenured) at the National Cancer Institute (NCI), National Institutes of Health (NIH), Bethesda, Maryland. He holds multiple titles within the NCI: Associate Director of the Center for Cancer Research, Co-Director of the Office of Translational Resources, Acting Branch Chief for the Genitourinary Malignancies Branch, Chief of the Clinical Pharmacology Program, and head of the Molecular Pharmacology Section. Dr. Figg is also the Co-Chief of Basic Research at the Center for Prostate Disease Research within the Walter Reed National Military Medical Center – Murtha Cancer Center in Bethesda, Maryland.

Dr. Figg has more than 825 peer-reviewed articles, and his work has been mentioned over 56,000 times in the scholarly literature. He has an H-index of 126 and an i10-index of 615, both indicators of scientific influence. He has published/edited six books.

Education
Dr. Figg grew up in Beaver Dam, Kentucky, and graduated from Ohio County High School, in Hartford, Kentucky (1981). He earned a BS in Pharmacy from Samford University, and a doctoral degree in Pharmacy from Auburn University. He completed an internship at the University of Alabama at Birmingham Hospital (1990) and a fellowship in Drug Development at the University of North Carolina at Chapel Hill (1992). He is a recipient of honorary degrees from Georgetown College and the Philadelphia College of Osteopathic Medicine.

Research and career
Dr. Figg is an expert in molecular pharmacology and clinical pharmacology, as well as the application of pharmacological concepts to the creation of anticancer drugs and biomarkers. His research encompasses the full drug development pipeline, from target identification and validation in drug discovery to preclinical development and clinical evaluation. Dr. Figg's primary research focus is the creation of innovative anticancer drugs. His laboratory focuses on understanding the genetics and molecular mechanisms that drive prostate cancer progression, elucidating mechanisms responsible for cancer drug resistance to develop novel treatment strategies for patients with advanced prostate cancer and other metastatic processes who have progressed on standard regimens and developing bench-to-bedside-to-bench approaches to facilitate the identification of novel druggable targets and for assessing the efficacy of novel therapeutic agents.

Having more than 30 years of professional experience, Dr. Figg is presently an adjunct professor of Medicine at Columbia University, Vagelos College of Physicians and Surgeons, Department of Medicine, Division of Oncology, New York, NY, a Clinical Professor of Pharmacy at Virginia Commonwealth University, School of Pharmacy, Department of Pharmacotherapy and Outcomes Science, Richmond, VA, and Adjunct Professor of Surgery at Uniform Services University, School of Medicine, Department of Surgery, Bethesda, MD. Additionally, Dr. Figg is a retired Captain from the Commissioned Corps of the United States Public Health Service.

Awards and honors
Dr. Figg has been honored with many awards including the Leon Goldberg Award from the American Society of Clinical Pharmacology and Therapeutics, the Allen J. Brands Award from United States Public Health Service, the Russell R. Miller Award and the Therapeutics Frontier Award from American College of Clinical Pharmacy, the Andrew Craigie Award from Association of Military Surgeons of the United States, the Philip C. and Ethel F. Ashby Lecture from the University of Oklahoma, the Sustained Contribution to the Scientific Literature Award from the American Society of Health-System Pharmacists Foundation, the Tyler Prize for Stimulation of Research from the American Pharmacists Association, the Charles Hatfield Lecture at Georgetown College, and the Albert Ebert Memorial Lecture University of Illinois. He has received the NIH’s Clinical Center Director Award (2007, 2012, 2015), NCI’s Outstanding Mentor Award (2008), and NIH’s Director Merit Award (2011). Dr. Figg is a fellow of both the American Colleges of Clinical  Pharmacy and Clinical Pharmacology.

Patents
Dr. Figg has obtained many patents for his inventions and his patents include Thalidomide analogs (US8853253B2), (US8546430B2), (US8716315B2), (WO2005016326A2). Materials and methods for ABCB1 polymorphic variant screening, diagnosis, and treatment (CA2629155A1), SLCO1B3 genotype (WO2008086002A2), Aza-epoxy-guaiane derivatives and treatment of cancer (WO2015120140A1), Hypoxia-inducible factor 1 (HIF-1) inhibitors (US10246463B2), Tetrahalogenated compounds useful as inhibitors of angiogenesis (US8143252B2), ABCB1 Genotyping for predicting the Microtubulin-Stabilization-Induced Toxicity (DE602007010939D1), CYP1B1 genotype (EP1943358B1), and Analogs of thalidomide as potential angiogenesis inhibitors (AU2002306596A1).

Publications
 Antibody-drug conjugates for cancer.
 Selumetinib in Children with Inoperable Plexiform Neurofibromas.
 Lutetium-177-PSMA-617: A Vision of the Future.
 PARP Inhibitors and Prostate Cancer: To Infinity and Beyond BRCA.
 Resistance to second-generation androgen receptor antagonists in prostate cancer.

References

American pharmacologists
Living people
Year of birth missing (living people)